Bhaurao Krishnaji Gaikwad (15 October 1902 – 29 December 1971), also known as Dadasaheb Gaikwad, was an Indian politician and social worker from Maharashtra. He was founder member of the Republican Party of India and was a member of parliament in both the Lok Sabha (1957 - 1962) and Rajya Sabha (1962 - 1968). He was a close colleague and follower of human rights leader B. R. Ambedkar. The people of Maharashtra honoured him with the sobriquet Karmaveer (King of actions) and the Government of India awarded him with Padma Shri in 1968 for his dedicated service to society.

Life

Gaikwad was born on 15 October 1902 into Mahar family at Ambe village in Dindori tehsil, Nashik district of Maharashtra.

Conversion
Gaikwad embraced Buddhism at the hands of Babasaheb Ambedkar at Deekshabhoomi, Nagpur on 14 October 1956. He imparted Buddha Dhamma Diksha to thousands at Chaitya Bhoomi, Mumbai on 7 December 1956.

Legacy
Government of Maharashtra gives special assistance to socially and economically backward people on his name, Karmaveer Dadasaheb Gaikwad Sabalikaran & Swabhiman Yojana.

The Government of India issued a commemorative stamp in his honour in 2002.

References

External links

Recipients of the Padma Shri in social work
Dalit activists
1902 births
1971 deaths
People from Nashik district
Rajya Sabha members from Maharashtra
Republican Party of India politicians
Marathi politicians
Social workers
20th-century Indian politicians
20th-century Buddhists
Social workers from Maharashtra
Indian Buddhists
Converts to Buddhism from Hinduism
Buddhist activists